The 1978–79 Kent Football League season was the 13th in the history of the Kent Football League, a football competition in England.

At the end of the previous season reserve sides of Dover, Folkestone & Shepway and Maidstone United all left the Kent League, with competition becoming one for ‘first teams’ only.
 
The league was won by Sheppey United, but the club was not promoted to the Southern Football League.

Clubs and League Table

The league featured 15 clubs which competed in the previous season, along with three new clubs:
Cray Wanderers, transferred from the London Spartan League
Darenth Heathside
Erith & Belvedere, transferred from the Athenian League

League table

References

External links

1978-79
1978–79 in English football leagues